

Events
Joan Esteve, troubadour, composes the pastorela ""

Births

Deaths
 Adam de la Halle (born 1237), a French trouvère, poet and musician
 Shang Ting (born 1209), writer of Chinese Sanqu poetry
 Tikkana (born 1205), second poet of  "Trinity of Poets (Kavi Trayam)" that translated Mahabharatamu into Telugu over a period of few centuries

13th-century poetry
Poetry